Bagarmossen metro station is on the green line of the Stockholm metro, located in Bagarmossen, Söderort in the south of Stockholm. The surface station was opened on 18 November 1958 as the southern terminus of the extension from Hammarbyhöjden. On 15 August 1994, the line was extended further to Skarpnäck.

The old surface-level station with the same name was in use between 18 November 1958 and 8 July 1994. After the surface level station closed, a number of residential buildings were constructed on the site of the station and its approaches.

References

External links
Images of Bagarmossen

Green line (Stockholm metro) stations
Railway stations opened in 1994